The Number of the Beast is a science fiction novel by American  writer Robert A. Heinlein, published in 1980. Excerpts from the novel were serialized in the magazine Omni (1979 October, November).

Plot
The book is a series of diary entries primarily by each of the four main characters: Zebadiah "Zeb" John Carter, programmer Dejah Thoris "Deety" Burroughs Carter, her mathematics professor father Jacob Burroughs, and off-campus socialite Hilda Corners. The names "Dejah Thoris", "Burroughs", and "Carter" are overt references to John Carter and Dejah Thoris, the protagonists of the Barsoom novels by Edgar Rice Burroughs.

In the opening, Deety is dancing with Zeb at a party at Hilda's mansion. Deety is trying to get Zeb to meet her father to discuss what she thinks is an article Zeb wrote about n-dimensional space, even going so far as to offer herself. Zeb figures out and explains to Deety that he is not the one who wrote the article but a relative with a similar name.

After dancing a very intimate tango, Zeb jokingly suggests the dance was so strong they should get married, and Deety agrees. Zeb is taken aback but then accepts. As they are leaving, Deety and Zeb rescue Jacob from a heated argument he is having with another faculty member before a fight breaks out. As they are approaching their vehicles, Hilda comes out, deciding to tag along. Zeb, having a premonition, grabs the three of them and ducks behind another vehicle before Jacob and Deety's vehicle explodes. Zeb gets everyone into his modified air car Gay Deceiver and by activating the Deceivers flying capability, escapes undetected by the authorities or the criminals who put a bomb in the other vehicle.

Zeb flies to Elko, Nevada, the state being the only one to allow people to get married 24 hours a day with no waiting period or blood test. The incidents have so traumatized Jacob that he has agreed to marry Hilda and so they have a double ceremony. The couples then go to Jacob's hidden cabin in the woods, where they have their honeymoons.

Thus begins the series of adventures that the four embark upon as they travel in the Gay Deceiver, which is equipped with the professor's "continua" device and armed by the Australian Defence Force. The continua device was built by Professor Burroughs while he was formulating his theories on n-dimensional non-Euclidean geometry. The geometry of the novel's universe contains six dimensions the three spatial dimensions, known to the real world, and three time dimensions: t, the real world's temporal dimension, τ (Greek tau), and т (Cyrillic te). The continua device can travel on all six axes. The continua device allows travel into various fictional universes, such as the Land of Oz, as well as through time. An attempt to visit Barsoom takes them to an apparently different version of Mars, seemingly under the colonial rule of the British and Russian Empires, but near the end of the novel, Heinlein's recurring character Lazarus Long hints that they had traveled to Barsoom and that its "colonial" status was an illusion imposed on them by the telepathically adept Barsoomians:

Title
In the novel, the biblical number of the beast turns out to be not 666 but  = 10,314,424,798,490,535,546,171,949,056, the initial number of parallel universes accessible through the continua device. It is later theorized by the character Jacob that the number may be merely the instantly accessible universes from a given location and that there is a larger structure that implies an infinite number of universes.

Literary significance and reception
Jack Kirwan wrote in National Review that the novel is "about two men and two women in a time machine safari through this and other universes. But describing The Number of the Beast thus is like saying Moby Dick is about a one-legged guy trying to catch a fish." He went on to state that Heinlein celebrates the "competent person".

Sue K. Hurwitz wrote in her review for the School Library Journal that it is "a catalog of Heinlein's sins as an author; it is sophomoric, sexist, militantly right wing, and excessively verbose" and commentary that the book's ending was "a devastating parody of SF conventions—will have genre addicts rolling on the floor. It's garbage, but right from the top of the heap."

Heinlein buff David Potter explained on alt.fan.heinlein, in a posting reprinted on the Heinlein Society, that the entire book is actually "one of the greatest textbooks on narrative fiction ever produced, with a truly magnificent set of examples of how not to do it right there in the foreground, and constant explanations of how to do it right, with literary references to people and books that did do it right, in the background." He noted that "every single time there's a boring lecture or tedious character interaction going on in the foreground, there's an example of how to do it right in the background."

Greg Costikyan reviewed The Number of the Beast in Ares Magazine #5 and commented: "No one writes like Heinlein, and what is a disappointment from him would be a smashing success from anyone else."

James Nicoll has credited it as having taught him that he does not have to finish reading every book he begins.

The Pursuit of the Pankera

On 1 February 2019, it was announced that a novel The Pursuit of the Pankera would be published from an unpublished Heinlein manuscript. The book was originally titled Six-Six-Six. The 185,000-word text mirrors The Number of the Beast for the first third, but then deviates from it. The more-traditionally Heinlein text was written before Number of the Beast but not published at the time. The novel was published by Art Manor Publishers under their CAEZIK SF & Fantasy imprint on 24 March 2020, in trade paperback or hardcover editions and in two eBook formats. A mass market paperback edition was published on 20 April 2021.

References

External links
 
 

1980 American novels
1980 science fiction novels
American science fiction novels
Barsoom
Metafictional novels
Flying cars in fiction
Novels by Robert A. Heinlein
Oz (franchise) books
Works originally published in Omni (magazine)
New English Library books